The 2005–06  KFC Twenty20 Big Bash was the inaugural season of the official Twenty20 domestic cricket competition in Australia. The six states were represented by six teams. The Queensland Bulls and the Tasmanian Tigers played in the first match, with no result being declared due to rain. The six teams were split into two groups of three, with Victoria finishing on top of Group A and New South Wales on top of Group B. It consisted of seven matches, including the final. The Victorian Bushrangers won the inaugural tournament, defeating the New South Wales Blues in the final at North Sydney Oval.

Group stages

Group A

Group B

Final

External links
Results at ESPNcricinfo
Cricket Archive Matches and Results 

KFC Twenty20 Big Bash seasons
Australia Twenty20
Big Bash